Peltodytes is a genus of water beetle which is native to the Nearctic, Europe, the Near East, and North Africa. Peltodytes can generally be differentiated from the similar Haliplus by the presence of a pair of spots on the posterior margin of the pronotum. The genus Peltodytes contains the following species:

 Peltodytes alluaudi Guignot, 1936
 Peltodytes bradleyi Young, 1961
 Peltodytes caesus (Duftschmid, 1805)
 Peltodytes callosus (LeConte, 1852)
 Peltodytes congoensis Zimmermann, 1924
 Peltodytes coomani Peschet, 1923
 Peltodytes darlingtoni Young, 1961
 Peltodytes dauricus Zimmermann, 1924
 Peltodytes dietrichi Young, 1961
 Peltodytes dispersus Roberts, 1913
 Peltodytes dunavani Young, 1961
 Peltodytes duodecimpunctatus (Say, 1823)
 Peltodytes edentulus (LeConte, 1863)
 Peltodytes festivus (Wehncke, 1876)
 Peltodytes floridensis Matheson, 1912
 Peltodytes intermedius (Sharp, 1873)
 Peltodytes lengi Roberts, 1913
 Peltodytes litoralis Matheson, 1912
 Peltodytes mexicanus (Wehncke, 1883)
 Peltodytes muticus (LeConte, 1863)
 Peltodytes nodieri Guignot, 1936
 Peltodytes oppositus Roberts, 1913
 Peltodytes ovalis Zimmermann, 1924
 Peltodytes pedunculatus (Blatchley, 1910)
 Peltodytes pekinensis Vondel, 1992
 Peltodytes quadratus Régimbart, 1895
 Peltodytes rotundatus (Aubé, 1836)
 Peltodytes sexmaculatus Roberts, 1913
 Peltodytes shermani Roberts, 1913
 Peltodytes simplex (LeConte, 1852)
 Peltodytes sinensis (Hope, 1845)
 Peltodytes speratus Régimbart, 1906
 Peltodytes sumatrensis Régimbart, 1885
 Peltodytes tamaulipensis Young, 1964
 Peltodytes tortulosus Roberts, 1913

References

External links
Peltodytes at Fauna Europaea

Haliplidae
Beetles described in 1878